Irene Linda Mugisa, is a female Ugandan politician, psychologist and a member of parliament for the Fort Potal City in the 11th Parliament of Uganda representing the National Resistance Movement (NRM) party.

Background and education 
She attained a Bachelor's of Social and Community Development degree from Mountain of the Moon University, a Diploma in Counselling Psychology from Uganda Martyrs University, and certificates in gender and development, policy making and implementation in Local Government, Finance Business and Customer Management.

Career history 
She has a political experience of a period of 20 years as a councilor and secretary in Kabarole Local Government Council. She is also a community development scientist with advocacy and counselling skills and has worked with some non-governmental organisations.

In 1997 she served as the General Secretary of Kasusu cell in Central Division, Fort Portal City.   She was also Secretary for Gender at the South Division Fort Portal Municipality.

In 2001, she was elected the Kabarole District Youth Councilor and later she was appointed the Secretary for Finance and Planning for the district council at the age 24 years and became the youngest among other leaders.

In 2021, Linda Irene Mugisa won the Fort Portal City Woman MP race.

References 

Living people
Members of the Parliament of Uganda
Women members of the Parliament of Uganda
Year of birth missing (living people)